Talmage Charles Robert "Tal" Bachman (born August 13, 1968) is a Canadian singer-songwriter and guitarist. He is best known for his 1999 hit, "She's So High", a pop rock tune from his self-titled 1999 album that led to a BMI award.

Musical career

1999–2000: Debut album
Bachman got his musical break when executives at EMI Music Publishing in New York City heard a demo tape, and aided him in securing a record deal with Columbia Records. Bob Rock (of Metallica, Aerosmith, Mötley Crüe, and Skid Row fame) signed on to co-produce his debut album. His first album, Tal Bachman, featured what would eventually become his hit single, "She's So High", which reached No. 1 on three different radio formats in Canada. The song became a multi-format Top 10 hit in the United States and internationally, earning BMI's "Song of the Year" award. The album earned Bachman two Juno awards in Canada, and much media exposure, including appearances on The Tonight Show with Jay Leno, MTV, MuchMusic, and E Network; and profiles, interviews, and reviews in Rolling Stone, Q Magazine, USA Today, Interview, and the Los Angeles Times. In support of the record, Bachman toured as an opening act for Bryan Adams and the Barenaked Ladies, and also toured in his own right.

2004–2005: Staring Down the Sun
Bachman's second album, Staring Down the Sun, was released in Canada on Sextant Records in August 2004 and was released in the United States by Artemis Records in 2006. The single "Aeroplane" reached No. 20 on the Canadian charts and was used in the 2005 film, American Pie Presents: Band Camp. It was played as an instrumental and during the credits.

Personal life
Bachman lives in Victoria, British Columbia, and is the son and the nephew of Canadian rockers Randy Bachman and Robbie Bachman, respectively, of the classic rock bands The Guess Who and Bachman–Turner Overdrive.  His sister Lorelei Bachman is also a writer and a musician.

He is a former member of the Church of Jesus Christ of Latter-day Saints (LDS Church), and went on a two-year mission to Argentina, but after two years of research into that church's origins, Bachman concluded that the church's founder Joseph Smith had invented his stories, and severed his ties to the church. In 2006, Bachman was interviewed for the 2007 PBS documentary called The Mormons. In it, he discussed his departure from the LDS Church. In 2008, Bachman also discussed his departure from the LDS Church when interviewed for the Bill Maher documentary Religulous.

As the holder of a bachelor's degree in political science, Bachman has moonlighted as a political commentator, writing for American Greatness and SteynOnline.

He plays right-wing and outside-centre for the Victoria, BC rugby club Castaway Wanderers RFC.

In 2012, while eating at Victoria, British Columbia's Cactus Club Cafe, Bachman was disappointed to learn that the restaurant had dropped Key lime pie, a personal favorite, from the dessert menu. He subsequently spearheaded a successful public pressure campaign to encourage restaurant management to restore the dessert. Reflecting upon the experience, Bachman posited Bachman's First Law of Commerce: "If it's great, they'll stop making it."

Discography

Studio albums

Compilation albums

Singles

Awards
Third Annual Canadian Radio Music Awards (2000)
 Best New Solo Artist – Rock
 Best New Solo Artist – Pop Adult
 Best New Solo Artist – Contemporary Hit Radio

29th Annual Juno Awards (2000)
 Best New Solo Artist (won)
 Best Producer (with Bob Rock) for "She's So High" and "If You Sleep" (won)
 Best Pop/Adult Album (nominated)
 Best Songwriter (nominated)

References

External links
 
 MTV: Tal Bachman profile
 

1968 births
Living people
20th-century Canadian male singers
21st-century Canadian male singers
Canadian agnostics
Canadian male guitarists
Canadian male singers
Canadian Mormon missionaries
Canadian people of German descent
Canadian people of Ukrainian descent
Canadian rock guitarists
Canadian rock singers
Canadian songwriters
Columbia Records artists
Former Latter Day Saints
Jack Richardson Producer of the Year Award winners
Juno Award for Breakthrough Artist of the Year winners
Mormon missionaries in Argentina
Musicians from Winnipeg